Marilyn Frye (born 1941) is an American philosopher and radical feminist theorist.  She is known for her theories on sexism, racism, oppression, and sexuality.  Her writings offer discussions of feminist topics, such as: white supremacy, male privilege, and gay and lesbian marginalization. Although she approaches the issues from the perspective of justice, she is also engaged with the metaphysics, epistemology, and moral psychology of social categories.

Education and career
Frye received a BA with honors in philosophy from Stanford University in 1963 and a PhD in philosophy at Cornell University in 1969. She wrote her dissertation, titled Meaning and Illocutionary Force, under the supervision of Max Black. Before coming to Michigan State University in 1974, she taught in the philosophy department at the University of Pittsburgh. From 2003 until her retirement, Frye was University Distinguished Professor at Michigan State University; she also served as Associate Dean for Graduate Studies of the College of Arts and Letters. In 2008 she was the Phi Beta Kappa Romanell Lecturer.

Research and publications
Frye is the author of The Politics of Reality (1983), a collection of nine essays which has become a "classic" of feminist philosophy.
 
In her chapter entitled "Oppression" in the book Feminist Frontiers, Frye discusses the idea of the double bind in gender. This double bind refers to "situations in which options are reduced to a very few and all of them expose one to penalty, censure or deprivation". Frye applies this principle to gender and the dilemma women often face in her discussion of oppression. For example, it is neither socially acceptable for a woman to be sexually active or for her to be sexually inactive and labelled a "man-hater" or "uptight". This absence of choice permeates so thoroughly into women's day-to-day life that even small things like how they choose to dress or talk are criticized. Frye acknowledges that men face issues as well, but differentiates the issues of men and women through the metaphor of a bird cage. As Frye tells it, each individual bind women face can be thought of as a single bar in a cage: by itself, it isn't enough to contain the bird. But, with enough bars, the bird is trapped inside the cage, left with nowhere to go. This is the complete absence of choice Frye describes: how it is the culmination of issues women face that is so "immobilizing" and why, for Frye, their struggle—and not men's—is considered oppression.

Frye is openly lesbian, and much of her work explores social categories—in particular, those based on race and gender.

Awards and distinctions
Frye was named Distinguished Woman Philosopher of the Year by the Society for Women in Philosophy in 2001.
Frye was chosen as Phi Beta Kappa's Romanell Professor in Philosophy for 2007-2008. The annually-awarded Romanell Professorship "recognizes the recipient's distinguished achievement and substantial contribution to the public understanding of philosophy." Recipients of this award also offer a series of lectures open to the public; Frye's series was entitled "Kinds of People: Ontology and Politics."

Bibliography

Books

Chapters in books 
 "Categories and Dichotomies", Encyclopedia of Feminist Theories, ed., Loraine Code, NY: Routledge, (2000)
 "Essentialism/Ethnocentrism: The Failure of the Ontological Cure", Is Academic Feminism Dead? Theory in Practice, ed., the Center for Advanced Feminist Studies at the University of Minnesota, NYU Press, (2000)

Journal articles 
 "The Necessity of Differences: Constructing a Positive Category of Women," SIGNS: Journal of Women in Culture and Society, Vol.21, No.4, Summer (1996)

References

External links 

 Michigan State University faculty profile page

1941 births
20th-century American non-fiction writers
20th-century American philosophers
20th-century American women writers
20th-century American LGBT people
21st-century American non-fiction writers
21st-century American philosophers
21st-century American women writers
21st-century American LGBT people
American feminist writers
American lesbian writers
American women non-fiction writers
American women philosophers
Cornell University alumni
Feminist philosophers
Feminist studies scholars
Lesbian academics
Lesbian feminists
LGBT people from Michigan
Living people
Michigan State University faculty
Philosophers of language
Radical feminists
Date of birth missing (living people)